Lee Rogers Berger (born December 22, 1965) is an American-born South African paleoanthropologist and National Geographic Explorer-in-Residence. He is best known for his discovery of the Australopithecus sediba type site, Malapa; his leadership of Rising Star Expedition in the excavation of Homo naledi at Rising Star Cave; and the Taung Bird of Prey Hypothesis.

Berger is known not only for his discoveries, but also for his unusually public persona in paleoanthropology, and for making his most notable discoveries open-access projects. He gives hundreds of talks per year, and has had a close relationship with National Geographic for many years, appearing in several of their shows and documentaries.

Early life and education
Berger was born in Shawnee Mission, Kansas in 1965, but was raised outside of Sylvania, Georgia in the United States. As a youth, Berger was active in the Boy Scouts, Future Farmers of America, and president of Georgia 4-H. In 1984, Berger was named Georgia's Youth Conservationist of the Year for his work in conserving the threatened gopher tortoise. He is a Distinguished Eagle Scout, and received the Boy Scouts of America Honor Medal for saving a life in 1987.

He graduated from Georgia Southern University in 1989 with a degree in anthropology/archaeology and a minor in geology.

He undertook doctoral studies in palaeoanthropology at the University of the Witwatersrand (Wits) in South Africa under Professor Phillip Tobias, focusing his research on the shoulder girdle of early hominins; he graduated in 1994. In 1991, he began his long term work at the Gladysvale site. This marked the same year that his team discovered the first early hominin remains from the site, making Gladysvale the first new early hominin site to be discovered in South Africa since 1948. In 1993, he was appointed to the position of research officer in the Paleo-Anthropology Research Unit (PARU) (now the Evolutionary Sciences Institute; ESI) at Wits.

Research career
He became a postdoctoral research fellow and research officer at the University of the Witwatersrand in 1995. He has been the leader of the Palaeoanthropology Research Group and has taken charge of fossil hominin excavations, including Sterkfontein, Swartkrans, and Gladysvale. In 2004, he was promoted to Reader in Human Evolution and the Public Understanding of Science. He is presently a research professor in the same topic at the Evolutionary Studies Institute (ESI) and the Centre of Excellence in Palaeosciences (CoE Pal) at Wits.

Research and other activities

Organizational offices 
Berger served as Executive Officer of the Palaeo-Anthropological Scientific Trust (PAST) (now the Palaeontological Scientific Trust; PAST) from 1994 to 2001. Berger served on the committee for successful application for World Heritage Site Status for the UNESCO Sterkfontein, Swartkans, Kromdraai, and Environs site. He also served on the Makapansgat site development committee, as well as the committee for both Makapansgat and Taung's application for World Heritage site status. He was also a founding Trustee of the Jane Goodall Trust South Africa.

Berger served with the Royal Society of South Africa, Northern Branch, between 1996 and 1998, and served as Secretary in 1996 and 1997. He also served on the Fulbright Commission, South Africa, chairing it in 2005, and chairing its Program Review Committee from 2002 to 2004.

Berger is a Fellow of the Royal Society of South Africa and serves on the Senior Advisory Board of the Global Young Academy. In 1997 he was appointed to an adjunct professorial position in the Department of Biological Anthropology and Anatomy at Duke University in Durham North Carolina and the following year as an honorary assistant professor in the Department of Anthropology at the University of Arkansas.

Specific study results

Palau fossils 
Berger was lead author of a controversial report of the discovery in 2006 of what he and colleagues claimed were small-bodied humans in Palau, Micronesia. Scholars have disputed the argument that these individuals are pygmoid in stature, or that they were the result of insular dwarfism; in an article titled "Small Scattered Fragments Do Not a Dwarf Make", anthropologists Scott M. Fitzpatrick (NC State), Greg C. Nelson (University of Oregon), and Geoffrey Clark (Australian National University) conclude that "[p]rehistoric Palauan populations were normal-sized and exhibit traits that fall within the normal variation for Homo sapiens," hence, concluding that their evidence did "not support the claims by Berger et al. (2008) that there were smaller-bodied populations living in Palau or that insular dwarfism took place" Berger and co-authors Churchill and De Klerk replied to the study, saying "the logical flaws and misrepresentations in Fitzpatrick and coworker's paper are too numerous to discuss in detail" and that their restudy report "amounts to a vacuous argument from authority... and ad hominem assault, and brings little new data to bear on the question of body size and skeletal morphology in early Palauans". John Hawks, the paleoanthropologist who edited the original Palau article for PLoS ONE, has replied in part to some of the dissenting researchers' claims (in his personal web blog).

Discovery of Australopithecus sediba 

In August 2008, Berger's 9-year-old son Matthew, found a clavicle and a jawbone embedded in a rock near Malapa Cave in South Africa. Subsequent excavation, headed by Berger, led to the discovery of numerous bones nearby that dated back nearly two million years. Along with various co-authors, Berger published a series of articles between 2010 and 2013 in the journal Science that describe what they call a new species, Australopithecus sediba, which had a mixture of primitive and modern characteristics. The finding was particularly promising because it potentially revealed a previously unknown transitional species between the more ape-like australopithecines and the more human-like Homo habilis. Berger claimed that this new finding represented "the most probable ancestor" of modern-day Homo sapiens.

His work at the Malapa site was significant not only because of the discovery itself, but also because of the way he and his collaborators shared information about their findings. While most paleoanthropological investigations are known for a high level of secrecy, he worked to make the sediba site an open access project. In addition to sharing digital data, he made the fossils found available on request to researchers wanting to study them themselves.

Discovery of Homo naledi 

On September 13, 2013, two recreational cavers, Rick Hunter and Steven Tucker, discovered a previously unknown, remote chamber within the well known Rising Star cave system. Discovering the floor of this chamber (now known as the Dinaledi Chamber or UW-101) littered with human-like bones, the pair reported their finds to a colleague, who in turn brought them to the attention of Berger. Recognizing their importance, and unable to access the chamber himself due to his size, Berger organized an expedition over social media that brought six qualified researchers in from around the world to commence an excavation of the remains in November 2013. An early career workshop was organized in May 2014 that brought together 54 local and international scientists to describe and study the more than 1550 fossils recovered. In September 2015, the team announced Homo naledi as a new hominin species, citing its unique mosaic of more ancestral and human-like traits. Other fossil bearing localities in the system were given the site numbers 102 to 104, though research regarding them has not yet been published.

Awards

Collaborative research papers by Berger have been recognized four times as being among the top 100 Science stories of the year by Discover Magazine, an international periodical focusing on popular scientific issues. The first recognition came in 1995 for his co-authored work with Ron Clarke of Wits on the taphonomy of the Taung site and in 1998 for his co-authored work with Henry McHenry of the University of California, Davis on limb lengths in Australopithecus africanus.

He is a National Press Photographers Association Humanitarian Award winner in 1987 for throwing his camera down while working as a news photographer for television station WTOC and jumping into the Savannah River to save a drowning woman. He is a Golden Plate Awardee of the Academy of Achievement. In 1997, the National Geographic Society in Washington, D.C. awarded him the first National Geographic Society Prize for Research and Exploration given for his research into human evolution. In April 2016, Berger was selected by Time as one of its "100 most influential people".

Personal life
Berger has resided in South Africa since 1989. His wife Jacqueline is a radiologist in the medical school at the University of the Witwatersrand, the same university where he works. They have a son, Matthew, and a daughter.

Selected publications
Over one hundred scientific and popular articles including several books:

Articles

Books
Redrawing the family tree? (National Geographic Press, 1998)
Visions of the Past (Vision. End. Wild. Trust, 1999)
Towards Gondwana Alive: promoting biodiversity and stemming the sixth extinction (Gondwana Alive Soc. Press, 1999)
In The Footsteps of Eve (with Brett Hilton-Barber) (National Geographic, 2001)
 The Official Field Guide to the Cradle of Humankind, with Brett Hilton-Barber (Struik, 2002). For a review, visit 
Change Starts in Africa (in South Africa the Good News) (S.A. Good News Publishing, 2002)
Working and Guiding in the Cradle of Humankind (Prime Origins Publishing and The South African National Lottery, 2005)

The Concise Guide to Kruger (Struik, 2007)

Berger, Lee; Hawks, John (2017). Almost Human: The Astonishing Tale of Homo naledi and the Discovery That Changed Our Human Story. Washington: National Geographic Society. .

See also
 Dawn of Humanity (2015 PBS film)
 Footprints of Eve

References

Further reading
 
 Berger's Published Curriculum Vitae
 In the Footsteps of Eve, with Brett Hilton-Barber (National Geographic, 2001)
 Paleoanthropology in South Africa, in Citizendium

External links
National Geographic Outpost
Fossil Hunter Television Series.
Explorers Bio, National Geographic Society
National Geographic blog of Rising Star Expedition members
National Geographic Live! - Part Ape, Part Human: The Fossils of Malapa
 
 
 
 

1965 births
Living people
Paleoanthropologists
Physical anthropologists
South African anthropologists
People from Johnson County, Kansas
Georgia Southern University alumni
Academic staff of the University of the Witwatersrand
Prehistorians
People from Sylvania, Georgia
Fellows of the Royal Society of South Africa
American expatriates in South Africa